The Gower House, located on Water St. in Smithland, Kentucky, was built in about 1780.  It was listed on the National Register of Historic Places in 1973.

It was built as an inn for travelers, on the south bank of the confluence of the Cumberland and Ohio rivers.

Author Ned Buntline, who wrote about Buffalo Bill Cody and other Western stories, lived in the inn in 1845.

References

Houses on the National Register of Historic Places in Kentucky
Georgian architecture in Kentucky
Federal architecture in Kentucky
Hotel buildings completed in 1790
National Register of Historic Places in Livingston County, Kentucky
1790 establishments in Virginia
Hotel buildings on the National Register of Historic Places in Kentucky
Smithland, Kentucky
Pre-statehood history of Kentucky